Atuabo Freeport is an ongoing infrastructure likely to be Ghana's third major port.

Location
The FreePort will be located within the Gulf of Guinea.

Facilities
The Free Port will have facilities including  an 18.5m deep channel and three quays of varying depths from 16.5m, 12m and 9m, clear activity zones including Offshore Logistics, Subsea Fabrication. There will also be facilities in place for Rig and Vessel Repair, Business Technology Park and General Business Support Infrastructure which will make it first of its kind in the West African subregion.

See also
Atuabo
Ghana Gas Company

References

Ports and harbours of Ghana